Miso is a traditional Japanese seasoning.

MISO or Miso may also refer to:

 MISO, short for Multiple Inputs, Single Output in system analysis 
 Master Input, Slave Output, a data line in the Serial Peripheral Interface Bus
 Military information support operations, the U.S. military term for the function formally known as Psychological Operations
 Midcontinent Independent System Operator, formerly known as Midwest Independent Transmission System Operator
 Misophonia, a neurological and hearing disorder characterized by fear or anxiety over certain sounds

See also
 Misoprostol, a medication used to start labor, induce abortions, prevent and treat stomach ulcers, and treat postpartum bleeding